The LXVII Army Corps, initially known as the LXVII Reserve Corps, was an army corps of the German Wehrmacht during World War II. The corps was formed in September 1942.

History 
The LXVII Reserve Corps was formed on 24 September 1942 in Wehrkreis II. Its initial purpose was to oversee and lead reserve divisions of Oberbefehlshaber West (Army Group D). In this, the LXVII Reserve Corps was similar to the LXVI Reserve Corps, which had been formed three days earlier, on 21 September. The initial corps commander of the LXVII Reserve Corps was Walther Fischer von Weikersthal.

On 20 January 1944, the LXVII Reserve Corps was renamed to become the LXVII Army Corps. It was subsequently activated for normal combat purposes and would serve, in order, under the 15th Army between February 1944 and November 1944, under the 1st Parachute Army in December 1944, under the 15th Army in January 1945, under the 5th Panzer Army between February 1945 and March 1945, and under the 11th Army in April 1945.

Structure

Noteworthy individuals 

 Walther Fischer von Weikersthal, corps commander of LXVII Reserve Corps and LXVII Army Corps (25 September 1942 – 7 June 1944).
 Otto Sponheimer, corps commander of LXVII Army Corps (7 June 1944 – 16 December 1944).
 Felix Schwalbe, corps commander of LXVII Army Corps (16 December 1944 – 21 December 1944).
 Otto Hitzfeld, corps commander of LXVII Army Corps (21 December 1944 – 5 May 1945).

References 

Corps of Germany in World War II
Military units and formations established in 1942
Military units and formations disestablished in 1945